Čučma is a village and municipality in the Rožňava District in the Košice Region of eastern Slovakia.

History

In historical records the village was first mentioned in 1300. Village has long mining traditions, there were several mines in the village where iron ore was extracted. Village has several historical monuments:

 Baroque-classicist bell tower from the 18th century

 Educational trial dedicated to the local mining history. It includes an old mining tunnel and a replica of a medieval mining device, which was built according to the medieval painting Rožňavská metercia.
 Maurer's Villa - secessionist villa that belonged to the polyhistor Arthur Maurer.

Geography
The village lies at an altitude of 345 metres and covers an area of 11.697 km².
It has a population of about 585 people.

Genealogical resources

The records for genealogical research are available at the state archive "Statny Archiv in Kosice, Slovakia"

 Roman Catholic church records (births/marriages/deaths): 1672-1898 (parish B)
 Lutheran church records (births/marriages/deaths): 1632-1925 (parish B)

See also
 List of municipalities and towns in Slovakia

External links
http://www.statistics.sk/mosmis/eng/run.html
Surnames of living people in Cucma

Villages and municipalities in Rožňava District